Satish Chandra Maheshwari (1933-2019) was an Indian botanist and a former professor at the University of Delhi. He is known for his contributions to the fields of plant physiology and plant molecular biology. Maheshwari is an elected fellow of the Indian Academy of Sciences, the Indian National Science Academy and the National Academy of Sciences, India. The Council of Scientific and Industrial Research, the apex agency of the Government of India for scientific research, awarded him the Shanti Swarup Bhatnagar Prize for Science and Technology, one of the highest Indian science awards, in 1972, for his contributions to biological sciences. He died from lung cancer on June 12, 2019.

Biography 
S. C. Maheshwari, born on 4 October 1933 in Jaipur in the Indian state of Rajasthan, did his schooling in Jaipur and, later, in Dacca (in the present day Bangladesh). He moved to India along with his family after the Indian independence in 1947 and graduated in botany (hons) from St. Stephen's College of the University of Delhi after which he secured his master's (MSc) and doctoral (PhD) degrees from the same university. Maheshwari's post-doctoral research was on the embryology of duckweeds under B. M. Johri and he started his career at his alma mater as a member of the faculty of science in 1954. After 4 years of service, Maheshwari obtained a Fulbright Smith Mundt Fellowship in 1959 and traveled to the US to where he continued his research at Yale University and California Institute of Technology. Returning to India, he resumed his career at Delhi University and served as a professor there as well as at Jaipur National University till his superannuation from service. In between, Maheshwari worked as a visiting scientist at Oxford University, as a Homi Bhabha Fellow at Harvard Biological Laboratories, USA during 1973–74, as a visiting professor at Yale University during 1981–82 and as a guest scientist at the International Centre for Genetic Engineering and Biotechnology.

Legacy 
One of the first significant contributions of Maheswari was the discovery of RNA polymerase activity in chloroplasts which he accomplished during his early stint at California Institute of Technology while working with Robert S. Bandurski and their researches revealed the presence of DNA in organelle. In 1966, he, along with Sipra Guha Mukherjee, developed a new high-speed culture technique for producing homozygous pure lines of haploid plants which is now in practice for crop improvement and for commercial production of horticultural and ornamental plants. Maheshwari's researches on plant growth hormones returned new protocols for the isolation of cytokinins and gibberellins and elucidated the function of salicylic acid during the flowering period. His work assisted in genetic engineering of plants and in the phytochrome control of plant metabolism.

Maheswari is the founder of the Department of Plant Molecular Biology at Delhi University, the first such department in India, where he established a unit for Plant Cell and Molecular Biology, another first in the country. Here, he is known to have led a group of scientists in the field of photobiology and in researches on rice chromosomes and their DNA sequencing. Maheshwari's researches have been detailed in over 200 articles and in a book, Signal Transduction in Plants: Current Advances, co-edited with Sudhir Kumar Sopory and Ralf Oelmüller. He has mentored 30 scholars in their MPhil, doctoral and post-doctoral researches and Sipra Guha Mukherjee (1938–2007), noted biologist, was one among them.

Awards and honors 
Maheswari was awarded the Shanti Swarup Bhatnagar Prize, one of the highest Indian science awards, by the Council of Scientific and Industrial Research in 1972. He also received several other honors including the Goyal Prize, J. C. Bose Gold Medal and Birbal Sahni Gold Medal of the Indian Botanical Society. A Homi Bhaba Fellow, Maheshwari was elected as a fellow by the Indian Academy of Sciences in 1975 and three years later, Indian National Science Academy also elected him as their fellow. He is also an elected fellow of the National Academy of Sciences, India (1979). Maheshwari's project, Survey and Synthesis the information in the area of molecular Biology of Plant Development and Differentiation, was selected for the Jawaharlal Nehru Fellowship in 1981 and the University of Hyderabad awarded him the Doctor of Science degree (honoris causa) in 2013.

Selected bibliography

See also 

 RNA polymerase
 Haploidy
 Cytokinins
 Gibberellins
 List of alumni of St. Stephen's College, Delhi
 List of University of Delhi people

Notes

References

External links 
 

Recipients of the Shanti Swarup Bhatnagar Award in Biological Science
1933 births
Delhi University alumni
Alumni of the University of Oxford
Yale University alumni
California Institute of Technology alumni
Academic staff of Delhi University
California Institute of Technology faculty
Indian molecular biologists
Plant physiologists
Fellows of The National Academy of Sciences, India
Fellows of the Indian Academy of Sciences
Fellows of the Indian National Science Academy
2019 deaths
Scientists from Jaipur
20th-century Indian botanists